Ellis Baker Usher (June 21, 1852April 21, 1931) was an American journalist, newspaper publisher, and Democratic politician.  He served as chairman of the Democratic Party of Wisconsin from 1887 to 1890, and was publisher of the La Crosse Chronicle for 20 years.

Biography
Usher was born in Buxton, Maine, in 1852.  As a child, his parents moved the family to La Crosse, Wisconsin, where his father had been hired to work as an agent of Cadwallader C. Washburn in charge of lumber operations on the Black River.  Ellis Usher attended local schools in La Crosse, then attended Lombard College in Galesburg, Illinois, for one year.

At age 16, he was hired as a clerical aide to Judge S. S. Burton, who was receiver of the U.S. Land Office and deputy collector of internal revenue.  After two years, he became a clerical aide in the real estate business of N. D. Taylor, and shortly became his partner in the business and also assisted in the publishing of a monthly real estate paper.

In 1873, he went to work as a reporter for the La Crosse Republican and Leader, and two years later purchased half ownership of the La Crosse Daily Liberal Democrat newspaper, which he later renamed the La Crosse Morning Chronicle.  He was the choice of the Democratic caucus for chief clerk of the Wisconsin State Senate in 1877, but was not elected. In 1879, he acquired full ownership of the paper.

In 1887, Usher was elected chairman of the Democratic Party of Wisconsin, and served for three years.  He resigned in 1890 after the death of his father forced him to allocate more time to his private business affairs.  He was known for strident speeches and editorials opposing William Jennings Bryan and his platform.

Usher sold the Chronicle in 1901 and moved to Washington, D.C., to work as a special correspondent for Milwaukee newspapers.  At the time of his death, he was described as an intimate friend of Theodore Roosevelt.  In his later years, he returned to Wisconsin and resided in Milwaukee and ran an advertising business there.

In addition to his journalism, Usher studied history and was a member of the Wisconsin Historical Society.  He published an eight-volume history of Wisconsin in 1914.  In 1920, he and his sister, Leila Usher, donated his collection of historical documents and references to the La Crosse Normal School Library.

Usher died in Milwaukee on April 21, 1931.

Published works

References

External links
 
 

People from Buxton, Maine
Politicians from La Crosse, Wisconsin
Democratic Party of Wisconsin chairs
Lombard College alumni
1852 births
1931 deaths